Zenless Zone Zero is an upcoming urban fantasy action role-playing game developed and published by HoYoverse. It is expected to release on Microsoft Windows and iOS.

Gameplay
Zenless Zone Zero is an urban fantasy action role-playing game with roguelike mechanics. The player assumes the role of a Proxy, a character who helps others explore the hostile alternate dimensions called Hollows. As they advance, the Proxy will recruit new members to their party as they continue to fight the Ethereal and other enemies. By combining the abilities of different members, players can deploy greater damage and combos onto enemies.

Setting
The game takes place in an post-apocalyptic futuristic metropolis known as New Eridu. Entities known as Ethereal have traveled out into the human world from portals called Hollows. The Ethereal have wreaked havoc on most of humanity, wiping most of them out. However, a select group of survivors have formed a bastion against the invaders called New Eridu, having survived the oncoming onslaught by extracting the Ethereal's technology and resources.

Development
HoYoverse revealed the game in May 2022 and began holding closed beta tests for PC and iOS in August of the same year.

Notes

References

External links

Upcoming video games
Action role-playing video games
Fantasy video games
Free-to-play video games
Hack and slash games
MiHoYo games
IOS games
Post-apocalyptic video games
Single-player video games
Urban fantasy video games
Video games developed in China
Windows games